Edinburgh Rugby (formerly Edinburgh Reivers, Edinburgh Gunners) is one of the two professional rugby union teams from Scotland. The club competes in the United Rugby Championship, along with the Glasgow Warriors, its oldest rival. Edinburgh plays the majority of its home games at Edinburgh Rugby Stadium.

The original Edinburgh District team played the first ever inter-district match against Glasgow District in 1872, winning the match 3–0.

The amateur district team was reformed with professionalism, as Edinburgh Rugby, in 1996 to compete in the Heineken Cup, its best performance coming in the 2011–12 season, when the club reached the semi-final but lost out narrowly to Ulster, 22–19. The quarter-final tie against Toulouse attracted a club record crowd of over 38,000 spectators to Murrayfield. In 2003–04 Edinburgh became the first Scottish team to reach the quarter-finals.

In the 2014–15 season, Edinburgh became the first Scottish club to reach a major European final, when they met Gloucester Rugby in the European Rugby Challenge Cup showpiece at Twickenham Stoop in London.

History
Edinburgh District played in the world's first ever inter-district match, against Glasgow District, in 1872.

For the history of the District prior to professionalism, see:

Professional era establishment: 1996

Following the introduction of professional rugby in 1995, the Scottish Rugby Union (SRU) considered that Scottish club sides would not be able to compete against the best teams from France and England. The SRU therefore decided that the four district teams were to be Scotland's vehicle for professional rugby and in 1996 the Edinburgh District team was reformed as Edinburgh Rugby to compete in the Heineken Cup. Because of the SRU's significant debt, partly as a result of the redevelopment of Murrayfield Stadium, further reorganisation soon became necessary and the four professional sides were reduced to two. After two seasons as Edinburgh Rugby, the club was subsequently merged with Border Reivers to form a new team known as Edinburgh Reivers.

For the 1999 and 2000 seasons the Scottish Rugby Union and Welsh Rugby Union joined forces, with the expansion of the Welsh Premier Division to include Edinburgh Reivers and Glasgow Caledonians, under the name Welsh-Scottish League. However, further change was imminent and in 2001 an agreement was made between the Irish Rugby Football Union, Scottish Rugby Union and Welsh Rugby Union to create a new competition which would bring in the four Irish provinces. 2001 saw the first incarnation of the Celtic League. In that inaugural season Edinburgh finished in sixth place.

The following season, to coincide with the re-establishment of the Border Reivers, a Scottish League competition modelled on the Tri-Nations was introduced alongside the Celtic League, however this survived for only a single season, Edinburgh becoming the only champions.

Following the reduction of Scotland's professional structure from four to two sides, a further rebranding took place. The Edinburgh Reivers name was replaced by Edinburgh Rugby, with the Glasgow Caledonians undergoing a similar renaming process, as part of a "major revamp" of the professional structure in Scotland.

In the 2003–04 season the team found some success, when it reached the Final of the inaugural Celtic Cup, beating Cardiff Blues and Connacht en route in the quarter-finals and semi-finals respectively. The team's good run came to an end in the Final, however, with a 21–27 loss to Ulster, at Murrayfield. David Humphreys kicked 17 points in the match to earn the Irish province the trophy

For the 2005–06 season, the Edinburgh team found itself looking for a new coach after the departure of Frank Hadden to coach Scotland. Sean Lineen, then Glasgow Warriors assistant coach, was linked with the post before Todd Blackadder acquired the position for the season after a spell as interim coach. During the same season the team nickname was incorporated into the official name, which became the Edinburgh Gunners. The "Gunners" moniker was dropped on 29 September 2006, after the club had become Scottish rugby's first private franchise during the summer. The team name reverted to Edinburgh Rugby. One reason for the change was that the name The Gunners was already a registered Trademark of Arsenal Football Club. Another reason was the wish of the new owners for a re-branding, including a different name and the introduction of a new logo.

Private ownership: 2006–07

Scotland's first private franchise: 2006
In 2006, it was announced that from the end of the 2005–06 season, Edinburgh would become a franchise. Finance would come from a private company headed by businessmen Alex and Bob Carruthers. This was thought to be a saving grace for Border Reivers. The team was thought to be the favourite to be folded, after the Scottish Rugby Union warned that funding problems could force it to scrap one of its Celtic League sides. The SRU was to retain a seat on the new company board and continue to provide development funding and support to the new owners. Following the departure of Todd Blackadder to join the Crusaders coaching setup in Super Rugby, Lynn Howells was appointed as head coach by Edinburgh's new Executive Chairman, Alex Carruthers.

Funding dispute and return to SRU: 2007
In July 2007, a dispute arose between the Scottish Rugby Union and the owners of the newly franchised Edinburgh team. According to owner Bob Carruthers the SRU owed Edinburgh a six-figure sum which, he said, had not been paid. Carruthers also claimed that SRU had threatened to withdraw funding should Edinburgh continue with legal action relating to the sum. During the dispute, Alex Carruthers resigned along with then Managing Director Graeme Stirling. The dispute caused much disruption in Scottish rugby at the time, leading to the temporary withdrawal of 12 players from the Scotland squad training for the 2007 Rugby World Cup. This included leading players such as Chris Paterson and Mike Blair

The dispute escalated when, on 9 July 2007, Edinburgh revoked its associate membership of the SRU. This led to doubts about Edinburgh Rugby's ability to fulfil fixtures in the Celtic League and Heineken Cup and, whether or not Edinburgh players were insured for playing at club level. The resignation was withdrawn on 12 July, with Bob Carruthers being quoted as asking to "talk directly to someone" and insisting that the proposed signing of Australia stand-off Stephen Larkham would go ahead.
Despite this, the dispute continued, with each party initiating legal action against the other. The situation was resolved in August 2007, with the termination of the franchise agreement and the return of Edinburgh to the direct control of the SRU.

Under Andy Robinson: 2007–2009

Following the return to SRU control, the club coach Lynn Howells was dismissed. The SRU's Head of Player Development was appointed interim coach and Nic Cartwright was appointed as chief executive. Former British and Irish Lions captain Gavin Hastings was subsequently appointed as chairman, stating his "desire and passion to see this game and this club grow". The proposed signing of Stephen Larkham fell through after the SRU was unable to honour the terms of the agreement. This was seen as a disappointment, because the signing had been considered a coup for the beleaguered SRU when it was initially announced.

Following an application process, it was announced on 1 October 2007 that Andy Robinson, the former England head coach, would become the club's new head coach. Edinburgh showed progress under Robinson and performed well at home in the Heineken Cup, posting wins against Leinster and Leicester Tigers and a narrow loss to Toulouse, earning a bonus point. Following disappointing performances by Scotland in the 6 Nations, and Robinson co-coaching Scotland A, there were rumours of Robinson taking a post within the Scotland set-up after helping Edinburgh to climb to 3rd in the Celtic League.
This progress, however, was counter-pointed by some disappointing results including being shut out by Cardiff Blues at Murrayfield and losing the 1872 Challenge Cup on aggregate to rivals Glasgow Warriors.

On 26 December 2008, a new home record attendance of 12,534 saw the game against Glasgow Warriors. In the 2008–09 season Edinburgh reached their highest position finishing in second place behind Munster.

Andy Robinson left in 2009 to take up the position of head coach of the Scottish national side. Rob Moffat took over at Edinburgh. Michael Bradley was the new manager from 2011 to 2012.

Under Michael Bradley: 2011–2013

Michael Bradley took over in May 2011 on a two-year contract.

The 2011–12 season saw the introduction of several young players into the squad including début seasons for 21-year-olds Matt Scott and Grant Gilchrist, 19-year-old Harry Leonard and first full seasons for back three players Tom Brown and Lee Jones plus the back row pair Stuart McInally and David Denton. Most of these players would become regular starters for the club and Jones, Brown, Scott, Gilchrist, McInally and Denton were destined for international honours. Domestically the season was not a success, with only 6 league wins out of 22 games, but the 2011–12 Heineken Cup campaign proved to be the most successful in the club's history when it topped Pool 2, including a remarkable home victory against Racing Métro by 48–47 and setting up a quarter final against French rugby giants Toulouse by scoring four tries against London Irish. The game against Toulouse in April 2012, was played before a new club record crowd of 38,887 and was closely contested, with Edinburgh holding out for a 19–14 win thanks to an early try from Mike Blair and penalties from captain Greig Laidlaw, setting up a semi-final in Dublin against Ulster. The semi-final was a close match but Ulster triumphed 22–19.

The 2012–13 season started with much expectation after the strengthening of the squad through the additions of W. P. Nel, John Yapp, Richie Rees, Dimitri Basilaia, Ben Atiga, Greig Tonks, Izak van der Westhuizen, and Andy Titterrell. These arrivals were however tempered by the loss of several experienced internationals, Mike Blair, Chris Paterson, Jim Thompson, Alan MacDonald, Esteban Lozada and Phil Godman among them. However, after another poor start to the Pro12 League, Edinburgh were then beaten 0–45 by Saracens at Murrayfield in the first round of Heineken Cup matches. This was followed by another high-scoring defeat when the team lost 33–0 to Munster Rugby at Thomond Park.

Following increasingly disappointing results and performances in the Pro12 league it was announced in February 2013 that Edinburgh would not be renewing Bradley's contract at the end of the season along with defence coach Billy McGinty. McGinty chose to leave his position with immediate effect with Bradley overseeing the defence until the end of the season. However, in a surprise move just a month later on 6 March 2013 Edinburgh announced that both Bradley and forwards coach Neil Back were being removed with immediate effect and coaches Stevie Scott and Duncan Hodge would take over until the end of the season.

In his final year to early March 2013 the Club lost all six matches in the Heineken Cup and recorded four league victories all season in the Pro12 against Cardiff, Zebre, Connacht and the Ospreys. Edinburgh Rugby accumulated seven losing bonus points in this period highlighting the need for minor adjustments to change the sides fortunes on the pitch.

In the remaining five matches on the season Edinburgh won three, recording victories against Ulster, Zebre and Gwent Dragons to finish the season in 10th place in the Pro12 one place higher than the 2011–12 season.

Under Alan Solomons: 2013–2016

Alan Solomons, formerly the coach of Western Province, Stormers, Ulster and more recently Super Rugby team the Kings, was appointed as Head Coach at the end of July 2013. Stevie Scott and Omar Mouneimne were appointed as Assistant Coaches.

Solomons' first season at the club was treated largely as a rebuilding period, with several players departing and replacements coming in. The league campaign culminated in an eighth-place finish.

2014–15 saw Edinburgh again finishing eighth, albeit with ten points and three victories more than the previous season. While the pre-season target of a top six finish wasn't achieved, there were other reasons to consider the campaign a success. The first came over the festive period when the team beat Glasgow Warriors over two legs to win the inter-city 1872 Cup for the first time in six seasons. After going down 16–6 in the first encounter at Scotstoun Stadium, the Murrayfield men turned the tables with a 20–8 victory in the return leg, with Tim Visser notching two first-half tries, to bring the trophy back to the capital for the first time since 2009. As the season reached its final stages, Edinburgh's excellent European form took them to within touching distance of more silverware.

Solomons left the club in September 2016 following a poor start to the season. Assistant coach Duncan Hodge was placed in temporary charge, and ultimately held the reins for the remainder of the campaign.

European Rugby Challenge Cup 2014–15
By finishing top of their European Rugby Challenge Cup group (containing the French Top 14 pair Lyon and Bordeaux as well as English Premiership team London Welsh) they progressed to the knockout stage, where they were seeded fifth. They went on to beat fourth seed London Irish 18–23 in the quarter finals at the Madejski Stadium. In the semi-finals they thrashed the Newport Gwent Dragons an impressive 45–16 in front of a home crowd of over 8,000 at Murrayfield, making them the first Scottish team to ever reach a European final. They faced Gloucester in the final at the Twickenham Stoop on the 2 May, losing 19–13.

Under Richard Cockerill: 2017–2021
In February 2017, the club announced the appointment of former Leicester Tigers and Toulon Head Coach Richard Cockerill for the following season.  Cockerill led the team to the play-offs of the 2017–18 Pro14 season, the first time the club have qualified for the end-of-season series since its introduction. Their season ended following a tight away defeat to Munster.

During his tenure, several Edinburgh players have made their international debuts for Scotland, including props Simon Berghan, Darryl Marfo and Murray McCallum, lock Lewis Carmichael, wing Darcy Graham, full-back Blair Kinghorn, hooker David Cherry, flankers Luke Hamilton and Jamie Ritchie, and former Edinburgh players Phil Burleigh, Cornell du Preez and George Turner, flanker Luke Crosbie, centres Chris Dean and James Johnstone, and scrum-halves Nathan Fowles, Sean Kennedy and Charlie Shiel were named in Scotland squads.

In addition, wing Duhan van der Merwe, prop Rory Sutherland, and flanker Hamish Watson have all toured with the British and Irish Lions in South Africa, with each one becoming a Test Lion in the first test match of the series, a 17–22 win for the Lions against the Springboks. However, in July 2021, Cockerill left Edinburgh by mutual consent. Former Scotland captain and Lions scrum-half Mike Blair has been appointed as the Head Coach for the 2021–22 season, Edinburgh's first in the new United Rugby Championship.

Under Mike Blair: 2021–2023

Following a frustrating season, Edinburgh announced the immediate departure of Head Coach Richard Cockerill by "mutual consent" in July 2021 with Mike Blair (who was at the time part of the Scotland International set up) announced as the new Head Coach later that month. Blair's appointment coincided with new signings including Scotland international James Lang, South African Henry Immelman and Argentine utility back Emiliano Boffelli. Blair's appointment also saw the departure of long time Attack Coach Duncan Hodge.

Blair's first game in charge was a 10-26 pre-season friendly loss to Newcastle Falcons; their first game in the new Edinburgh Rugby Stadium (since renamed the DAM Health Stadium for sponsorship reasons). Edinburgh made a good start to their first United Rugby Championship campaign and also the European Challenge Cup where they beat Saracens 18–21 away in the first round.

Stadia

Edinburgh Rugby have played at a number of grounds over the years including Meadowbank Stadium, Meggetland Sports Complex and most recently Myreside. It was recognised over the years by fans and players alike that Edinburgh have lacked a true Home Ground with BT Murrayfield often criticised for providing a poor atmosphere due to being largely empty for most games.

On 31 May 2018, Edinburgh Rugby announced a new proposed 7,800-seater Edinburgh Rugby Stadium to be built on the training pitches at Murrayfield. The stadium will cost Scottish Rugby an estimated £5 million. The stadium was completed on 16 February 2021 but will not host matches straight away.

Current standings

Honours
European Rugby Challenge Cup
Runners-up: 1 (2015)
United Rugby Championship
Runners-up: 1 (2009)
Scottish-Italian Shield: 1 (2022)
Scottish Inter-District Championship / Scottish League
Winners: 3 (1997–98), (1998–99), (2002-03)
1872 Cup
Winners: 7 (2008–09), (2014–15), (2015–16), (2017–18), (2018–19), (2019–20), (2021–22)
Celtic Cup
Runners Up: 1 (2003-04)
Melrose Sevens
Winners: 1 (2016)
Glasgow City Sevens
Winners: 2 (2005, 2006)
 Capital Sevens
 Winners: (2007, 2014, 2015)

Current squad

Academy players

Former players and present and past coaches

While still an amateur side, Edinburgh District capped the Royal HSFP forward James Robertson in the 1870s. Robertson was the first black person to play rugby union.

Notable former players
Former players who have played for Edinburgh and have more than 20 caps for their respective country.

  Ander Monro
  Mike Pyke
  Netani Talei
  Todd Blackadder
  Dave Hewett
  John Barclay
  Mike Blair
  Geoff Cross
  Nick De Luca
  Rob Dewey
  Alasdair Dickinson
  Marcus Di Rollo
  Ross Ford
  Phil Godman
  Ryan Grant
  Dougie Hall
  Jim Hamilton
  Nathan Hines
  Duncan Hodge
  Ally Hogg
  Allan Jacobsen
  Alastair Kellock
  Greig Laidlaw
  Brendan Laney
  Rory Lawson
  Scott Murray
  Chris Paterson
  Craig Smith
  Hugo Southwell
  Alasdair Strokosch
  Simon Taylor
  Tim Visser
  Simon Webster

Coaches

  Steve Diamond 2023– (interim)
  Mike Blair 2021–2023
  Richard Cockerill 2017–2021
  Duncan Hodge 2016–2017 (interim)
  Alan Solomons 2013–2016
  Stevie Scott 2013 (interim)
  Michael Bradley 2011–2013
  Nick Scrivener 2011 (interim)
  Rob Moffat 2009–2011
  Andy Robinson 2007–2009
  Henry Edwards 2007 (interim)
  Lynn Howells 2006–2007
  Todd Blackadder 2005–2006
  Frank Hadden 2000–2005
  Bob Easson 2000
  Ian Rankin 1998–2000

Statistics

Heineken Cup / Rugby Champions Cup

European Challenge Cup / Rugby Challenge Cup

Celtic League/Pro12/Pro14/United Rugby Championship

Scottish League

Welsh/Scottish League

Edinburgh and District
The Tennents Premiership is the premier club competition over the Edinburgh region. The district includes clubs from the City of Edinburgh, West Lothian, Midlothian and East Lothian.

Currently four district clubs compete at the top level of amateur rugby in Scotland.

National leagues
BT National League is an amateur league competition for rugby union clubs in Scotland. It forms the second tier of the Scottish League Championship.

East leagues
The East leagues cover the Edinburgh & District and the Scottish Borders area. They play at a level below that of the National Leagues structure. Winners of the league may progress to the National League.

The Clubs
Edinburgh and District consists of 32 clubs.

City of Edinburgh
There are 20 clubs in the City of Edinburgh.

East Lothian
There are 6 clubs in East Lothian.

West Lothian
There are 3 clubs in West Lothian.

Midlothian
There are 3 clubs in Midlothian.

Notes

References

External links
 

 
Edinburgh Gunners
Scottish rugby union teams
Rugby clubs established in 1872
Sports teams in Edinburgh
United Rugby Championship teams